The timeline of investigations into Donald Trump and Russia is split into the following pages:

November 8, 2016–January 2017
 Timeline of post-election transition following Russian interference in the 2016 United States elections

2017
 Timeline of investigations into Donald Trump and Russia (January–June 2017)
 Timeline of investigations into Donald Trump and Russia (July–December 2017)

2018
 Timeline of investigations into Donald Trump and Russia (January–June 2018)
 Timeline of investigations into Donald Trump and Russia (July–December 2018)

2019
 Timeline of investigations into Donald Trump and Russia (January–June 2019)
 Timeline of investigations into Donald Trump and Russia (July–December 2019)

2020–2022
 Timeline of investigations into Donald Trump and Russia (2020–2022)

See also 

 Timelines related to Donald Trump and Russian interference in United States elections